Stefan Čolović (born 2 July 1994) is a Serbian born Swiss football defender.

Career
Čolović played for young categories of Basel, and later he moved in Tottenham Hotspur. In summer 2014 he signed OFK Beograd. He made his Jelen SuperLiga debut for OFK Beograd on away match against Radnički Kragujevac on 2 November 2014.

Career statistics

References

External links
 

1994 births
Living people
Footballers from Belgrade
Association football defenders
Swiss men's footballers
Serbian footballers
OFK Beograd players
Serbian SuperLiga players